The men's triple jump field event at the 1960 Olympic Games took place on September 6. Thirty-nine athletes from 24 nations competed. The maximum number of athletes per nation had been set at 3 since the 1930 Olympic Congress. Józef Szmidt of Poland won the gold medal. It was Poland's first medal and first victory in the men's triple jump. Vitold Kreyer of the Soviet Union repeated his bronze medal performance from 1956, becoming the sixth man to win two medals in the event. His countryman Vladimir Goryaev took silver; this made the Soviet Union the fourth nation to have two men on the podium in the same year in the triple jump (the United States, Sweden, and Japan) and the fourth nation to reach the podium three Games in a row (the United States, Finland, and Japan).

Background

This was the 14th appearance of the event, which is one of 12 athletics events to have been held at every Summer Olympics. Returning finalists from the 1956 Games were two-time gold medalist (and three-time finalist) Adhemar da Silva of Brazil, silver medalist Vilhjálmur Einarsson of Iceland, bronze medalist Vitold Kreyer of the Soviet Union, two men each from the United States (Bill Sharpe and Ira Davis), Japan (Koji Sakurai and Hiroshi Shibata), and Finland (Kari Rahkamo and Hannu Rantala), Ryszard Malcherczyk of Poland, and Éric Battista of France. But among this veteran field, an Olympic newcomer was favored: Józef Szmidt was the European champion and had broken the world record with the first over-17-metre jump at the Polish championships a month before the Games.

Cuba, Iran, Iraq, and Spain each made their first appearance in the event; Germany made its first appearance as the "United Team of Germany". The United States competed for the 14th time, having competed at each of the Games so far.

Competition format

The competition used the two-round format introduced in 1936. In the qualifying round, each jumper received three attempts to reach the qualifying distance of 14.80 metres; if fewer than 12 men did so, the top 12 (including all those tied) would advance. In the final round, each athlete had three jumps; the top six received an additional three jumps, with the best of the six to count.

Records

These are the standing world and Olympic records (in metres) prior to the 1956 Summer Olympics.

Józef Szmidt broke the Olympic record in the qualifying round with a jump of 16.44 metres; he improved on that further in the first jump of the final round (16.78 metres) and the third jump of the final round (16.81 metres).

Schedule

All times are Central European Time (UTC+1)

Results

All jumpers reaching 15.50 metres advanced to the finals. All distances are listed in metres.

Qualifying

Final

References

M
Triple jump at the Olympics
Men's events at the 1960 Summer Olympics